Myers is an unincorporated community in Nicholas County, Kentucky, United States.  It lies along Route 32 northeast of the city of Carlisle, the county seat of Nicholas County.  Its elevation is 627 feet (191 m).

References

Unincorporated communities in Nicholas County, Kentucky
Unincorporated communities in Kentucky